Thitarodes namnai is a species of moth of the family Hepialidae. It is found in Bhutan.

References

Moths described in 2010
Hepialidae